In chemistry, an onium ion is a cation formally obtained by the protonation of mononuclear parent hydride of a pnictogen (group 15 of the periodic table), chalcogen (group 16), or halogen (group 17). The oldest-known onium ion, and the namesake for the class, is ammonium, the protonated derivative of ammonia, .

The name onium is also used for cations that would result from the substitution of hydrogen atoms in those ions by other groups, such as organic groups, or halogens; such as tetraphenylphosphonium, . The substituent groups may be divalent or trivalent, yielding ions such as iminium and nitrilium.

A simple onium ion has a charge of +1. A larger ion that has two onium ion subgroups is called a double onium ion, and has a charge of +2. A triple onium ion has a charge of +3, and so on.

Compounds of an onium cation and some other anion are known as onium compounds or onium salts.

Onium ions and onium compounds are inversely analogous to  ions and ate complexes:
Lewis bases form onium ions when the central atom gains one more bond and becomes a positive cation.
Lewis acids form  ions when the central atom gains one more bond and becomes a negative anion.

Simple onium cations (hydrides with no substitutions)

Group 13 (boron group) onium cations 
boronium cation,  (protonated borane)
further boronium cations,  (protonated boranes)

Group 14 (carbon group) onium cations 
carbonium ions (protonated hydrocarbons) have a pentacoordinated carbon atom with a +1 charge.
alkanium cations,  (protonated alkanes)
methanium,  (protonated methane) (Sometimes called carbonium, because it is the simplest member of that class, but that use is deprecated because of multiple definitions. Sometimes called methonium, but methonium also has multiple definitions. Abundant in outer space.)
ethanium,  (protonated ethane)
propanium,  (propane protonated on an unspecified carbon)
propylium, or propan-1-ylium (propane protonated on an end carbon)
propan-2-ylium (propane protonated on the middle carbon)
butanium,  (butane protonated on an unspecified carbon)
n-butanium (n-butane protonated on an unspecified carbon)
n-butylium, or n-butan-1-ylium (n-butane protonated on an end carbon)
n-butan-2-ylium (n-butane protonated on a middle carbon)
isobutanium (isobutane protonated on an unspecified carbon)
isobutylium, or isobutan-1-ylium (isobutane protonated on an end carbon)
isobutan-2-ylium (isobutane protonated on the middle carbon)
octonium or octanium,  (protonated octane)
silanium (sometimes silonium),  (protonated silane) (should not be called siliconium
disilanium,  (protonated disilane)
further silanium cations,  (protonated silanes)
germonium,  (protonated germane)
stannonium,  (protonated ) (not protonated stannane )
plumbonium,  (protonated )

Group 15 (pnictogen) onium cations
ammonium (IUPAC name azanium),  (protonated ammonia (IUPAC name azane))
phosphonium,  (protonated phosphine)
arsonium,  (protonated arsine)
stibonium,  (protonated stibine)
bismuthonium,  (protonated bismuthine)

Group 16 (chalcogen) onium cations
oxonium,  (protonated water (IUPAC name oxidane). Oxonium is better known as hydronium, though hydronium implies a solvated or hydrated proton. It may also be called hydroxonium.)
sulfonium,  (protonated hydrogen sulfide)
selenonium,  (protonated hydrogen selenide)
telluronium,  (protonated hydrogen telluride)
polononium,  (protonated hydrogen polonide)

Hydrogen onium cation
hydrogenonium, better known as trihydrogen cation,  (protonated molecular or diatomic hydrogen), found in ionized hydrogen and interstellar space

Group 17 (halogen) onium cations, halonium ions,  (protonated hydrogen halides)
fluoronium,  (protonated hydrogen fluoride)
chloronium,  (protonated hydrogen chloride)
bromonium,  (protonated hydrogen bromide)
iodonium,  (protonated hydrogen iodide)
astatonium,  (protonated hydrogen astatide)

Pseudohalogen onium cations
aminodiazonium,  (protonated hydrogen azide)
methylidyneammonium and hydrocyanonium, isomers  (protonated hydrogen cyanide)

Group 18 (noble gas) onium cations
hydrohelium or helonium, better known as helium hydride ion,  (protonated helium)
neonium,  (protonated neon)
argonium,  (protonated argon)
kryptonium,  (protonated krypton)
xenonium,  (protonated xenon)
radonium,  (protonated radon)
trifluoroxenonium,  ( is neutral.)

Onium cations with monovalent substitutions
hydroxylammonium,  (protonated hydroxylamine)
methylammonium,  (protonated methylamine)
ethylammonium,  (protonated ethylamine)
hydrazinium, or diazanium,  (protonated hydrazine, a.k.a. diazane)
anilinium (a.k.a. phenylammonium),  (protonated aniline, a.k.a. phenylamine, aminobenzene)
secondary ammonium cations,  (protonated secondary amines)
dimethylammonium (sometimes dimethylaminium),  (protonated dimethylamine)
diethylammonium (sometimes diethylaminium),  (protonated diethylamine)
ethylmethylammonium,  (protonated ethylmethylamine)
diethanolammonium (sometimes diethanolaminium),  (protonated diethanolamine)
tertiary ammonium cations,  (protonated tertiary amines)
trimethylammonium  (protonated trimethylamine)
triethylammonium  (protonated triethylamine)
quaternary ammonium cations,  or 
tetrafluoroammonium, 
tetramethylammonium, 
tetraethylammonium, 
tetrapropylammonium, 
tetrabutylammonium,  or abbreviated 
trimethyl ammonium compounds, 
didecyldimethylammonium, 
pentamethylhydrazinium, 
quaternary phosphonium cations,  or 
tetraphenylphosphonium, 
primary oxonium cations,  (protonated alcohols )
alkyloxonium cations  (protonated alcohols)
methyloxonium,  (protonated methanol)
ethyloxonium,  (protonated ethanol)
secondary oxonium cations,  (protonated ethers )
dialkyloxonium cations (protonated ethers)
dimethyloxonium,  (protonated dimethyl ether)
tertiary oxonium cations, 
trifluorooxonium,  (hypothetical)
trimethyloxonium, 
triethyloxonium, 
oxatriquinacene,  (cyclic oxonium ion)
oxatriquinane,  (cyclic oxonium ion)
primary sulfonium cations,  (protonated thiols )
secondary sulfonium cations,  (protonated thioethers )
dimethylsulfonium,  (protonated dimethyl sulfide)
tertiary sulfonium cations, 
trimethylsulfonium, 
primary fluoronium cations,  (protonated fluorides RF)
secondary fluoronium cations, 
dichlorofluoronium,

Onium cations with polyvalent substitutions
secondary ammonium cations having one double-bonded substitution, 
diazenium,  (protonated diazene)
guanidinium,  (protonated guanidine) (has a resonance structure and a planar molecular geometry)
tertiary ammonium cations having one triple-bonded substitution, R≡NH+
nitrilium,  (protonated nitrile)
diazonium or diazynium,  (protonated nitrogen, in other words, protonated diazyne)
cyclic tertiary ammonium cations where nitrogen is a member of a ring,  (the ring may be aromatic)
pyridinium,  (protonated pyridine)
quaternary ammonium cations having one double-bonded substitution and two single-bonded substitutions, 
iminium,  (substituted protonated imine)
diazenium,  (substituted protonated diazene)
thiazolium, (substituted protonated thiazole)
quaternary ammonium cations having two double-bonded substitutions, 
nitronium, 
bis(triphenylphosphine)iminium, 
quaternary ammonium cations having one triple-bonded substitution and one single-bonded substitution, 
diazonium,  (substituted protonated nitrogen, in other words, substituted protonated diazyne)
nitrilium,  (substituted protonated nitrile)
tertiary oxonium cations having one triple-bonded substitution, 
acylium ions, 
nitrosonium, 
cyclic tertiary oxonium cations where oxygen is a member of a ring,  (the ring may be aromatic)
pyrylium, 
tertiary sulfonium cations having one triple-bonded substitution, 
thionitrosyl,

Double onium dications
hydrazinediium or hydrazinium(2+) dication,  (doubly protonated hydrazine, in other words, doubly protonated diazane)
diazenediium cation,  (doubly protonated diazene)
diazynediium cation,  (doubly protonated dinitrogen, in other words, doubly protonated diazyne)

Enium cations
The extra bond is added to a less-common parent hydride, a carbene analog, typically named -ene or -ylene, which is neutral with 2 fewer bonds than the more-common hydride, typically named -ane or -ine.
borenium cations,  (protonated borylenes a.k.a. boranylidenes)
carbenium cations,  (protonated carbenes) have a tricoordinated carbon atom with a +1 charge.
alkenium cations,  (n ≥ 2) (protonated alkenes)
methenium cation,  (protonated methylene)
ethenium,  (protonated ethene)
benzenium,  (protonated benzene)
tropylium,  (protonated tropylidene)
silylium cations,  (protonated silylenes)
nitrenium cations,  (protonated nitrenes)
phosphinidenium cations,  (protonated phosphinidene)
mercurinium cations,  (protonated organomercury compounds; formed as intermediates in oxymercuration reactions)

Substituted eniums
diphenylcarbenium,  (di-substituted methenium)
triphenylcarbenium,  (tri-substituted methenium)

Ynium cations
carbynium ions (protonated carbynes) have a carbon atom with a +1 charge.
alkynium cations,  (n ≥ 2) (protonated alkynes)
methynium cation,  (protonated methylidyne radical)
ethynium,  (protonated ethyne)

See also
Carbonium ion
Lyonium ion, a protonated solvent molecule
Lyate ion, a deprotonated solvent molecule

References

External links
Ions and Radicals, Queen Mary University of London

Cations
Chemical nomenclature